The enzyme cystathionine γ-lyase (EC 4.4.1.1, CTH or CSE; also cystathionase; systematic name L-cystathionine cysteine-lyase (deaminating; 2-oxobutanoate-forming)) breaks down cystathionine into cysteine, 2-oxobutanoate (α-ketobutyrate), and ammonia:

L-cystathionine + H2O = L-cysteine + 2-oxobutanoate + NH3 (overall reaction)
(1a) L-cystathionine = L-cysteine + 2-aminobut-2-enoate
(1b) 2-aminobut-2-enoate = 2-iminobutanoate (spontaneous)
(1c) 2-iminobutanoate + H2O = 2-oxobutanoate + NH3 (spontaneous)

Pyridoxal phosphate is a prosthetic group of this enzyme.

Cystathionine γ-lyase also catalyses the following elimination reactions:
  L-homoserine to form H2O, NH3 and 2-oxobutanoate
 L-cystine, producing thiocysteine, pyruvate and NH3
 L-cysteine producing pyruvate, NH3 and H2S

In some bacteria and mammals, including humans, this enzyme takes part in generating hydrogen sulfide. Hydrogen sulfide is one of a few gases that was recently discovered to have a role in cell signaling in the body.

Enzyme mechanism 

Cystathionase uses pyridoxal phosphate to facilitate the cleavage of the sulfur-gamma carbon bond of cystathionine, resulting in the release of cysteine.  The lysine residue reforms the internal aldimine by kicking off α-iminobutyric acid. Afterwards the external ketimine is hydrolyzed, causing the formation of α-ketobutyrate. 

The amino group on cystathionine is deprotonated and undergoes a nucleophilic attack of the internal aldimine. An additional deprotonation by a general base results in the formation of the external aldimine and removal of the lysine residue. The basic lysine residue is then able to deprotonate the alpha carbon, pushing electron density into the nitrogen of the pyridine ring. Pyridoxal phosphate is necessary to stabilize this carbanionic intermediate; otherwise the proton's pKa would be too high. The beta carbon is then deprotonated, creating an alpha-beta unsaturation and pushing a lone pair onto the aldimine nitrogen. To reform the aldimine, this lone pair pushes back down, cleaving the sulfur-gamma carbon bond, resulting in the release of cysteine.

A pyridoxamine derivative of vinyl glyoxylate remains after the gamma elimination. The lone pair from the pyridine nitrogen pushes electron density to the gamma carbon, which is protonated by lysine. Lysine then attacks the external aldimine, pushing electron density to the beta carbon, which is protonated by a general acid. The imine is then hydrolyzed to release α-ketobutyrate. Deprotonation of the lysine residue causes ammonia to leave, thus completing the catalytic cycle.

Cystathionine gamma lyase also shows gamma-synthase activity depending on the concentrations of reactants present. The mechanisms are the same until they diverge after formation of the vinyl glyoxylate derivative. In the gamma synthase mechanism, the gamma carbon is attacked by a sulfur nucleophile, resulting in the formation of a new sulfur-gamma carbon bond.

Enzyme structure 
Cystathionine γ-lyase is a member of the Cys/Met metabolism PLP-dependent enzymes family. Other members include cystathionine γ synthase, cystathionine β lyase, and methionine γ lyase. It is also a member of the broader aspartate aminotransferase family. Like many other PLP-dependent enzymes, cystathionine γ-lyase is a tetramer with D2 symmetry.

Pyridoxal phosphate is bound in the active site by Lys212.

Disease relevance

Cysteine is the rate-limiting substrate in the synthetic pathway for glutathione in the eye. Glutathione is an antioxidant that protects crystallins in the eye from reactive oxygen species; denatured crystallins can lead to cataracts. Cystathionase is also a target for reactive oxygen species. Thus as cystathionase is oxidized, its activity decreases, causing a decrease in cysteine and, in turn, glutathione in the eye, leading to a decrease in antioxidant availability, causing a further decrease in cystathionase activity. Deficiencies in cystathionase activity have also been shown to contribute to glutathione depletion in patients with cancer and AIDS.

Mutations and deficiencies in cystathionase are associated with cystathioninuria. The mutations T67I and Q240E weaken the enzyme's affinity for pyridoxal phosphate, the co-factor vital to enzymatic function. Low levels of H2S have also been associated with hypertension in mice.

Excessive levels of H2S, due to increased activity of cystathionase, are associated with endotoxemia, acute pancreatitis, hemorrhagic shock, and diabetes mellitus.

Propargylglycine and β-cyanoalanine are two irreversible inhibitors of cystathionase used to treat elevated H2S levels. Mechanistically, the amino group of propargylglycine attacks the aldimine to form an external aldimine. The β position of the alkyne is then deprotonated to form the allene, which is then attacked by the phenol of Tyr114. The internal aldimine can regenerate, but the newly created vinyl ether sterically hinders the active site, blocking cysteine from attacking pyridoxal phosphate.

Regulation
H2S decreases transcription of cystathionase at concentrations between 10 and 80μM. However, transcription is increased by concentrations near 120μM, and inhibited completely at concentrations in excess of 160μM.

See also
 Cysteine metabolism

References

External links
 

EC 4.4.1